Gregory N. Price is an American economist who is a professor of economics at the University of New Orleans, and a former president of the National Economic Association.

Education and early life 
Price grew up in New Haven, Connecticut. He graduated from Morehouse College and received his MA and PhD from the University of Wisconsin-Milwaukee.

Career 
Price taught at North Carolina A&T State University from 1993-2004, at Jackson State University from 2004-2007, at Morehouse College from 2007-2013, where he was Charles E. Merrill Professor and Economics Department Chair, at Langston University from 2013-2015, at Morehouse College from 2016-2019, and at the University of New Orleans since 2019. He has been president of the National Economic Association. His research interests include economic inequality, entrepreneurship, African economic development, and the economic performance of historically Black colleges and universities.

Selected publications 

 Gyimah-Brempong, Kwabena, and Gregory N. Price. "Crime and punishment: And skin hue too?." American Economic Review 96, no. 2 (2006): 246-250.
 Price, Gregory N. "Economic Growth in a Cross‐section of Nonindustrial Countries: Does Colonial Heritage Matter for Africa?." Review of Development Economics 7, no. 3 (2003): 478-495.
 Elu, Juliet U., and Gregory N. Price. "Does China transfer productivity enhancing technology to Sub‐Saharan Africa? Evidence from manufacturing firms." African Development Review 22 (2010): 587-598.
 Price, Gregory N., William Spriggs, and Omari H. Swinton. "The relative returns to graduating from a historically Black college/university: Propensity score matching estimates from the national survey of Black Americans." The Review of Black Political Economy 38, no. 2 (2011): 103-130.
 Agesa, Jacqueline, Maury Granger, and Gregory N. Price. "Economics faculty research at teaching institutions: Are historically black colleges different?." Southern Economic Journal (2000): 427-447.

References 

Living people
21st-century American economists
Morehouse College alumni
University of Wisconsin–Milwaukee alumni
African-American economists
North Carolina A&T State University faculty
Morehouse College faculty
Jackson State University faculty
University of New Orleans faculty
Year of birth missing (living people)
Presidents of the National Economic Association
21st-century African-American people